Immigrants Against the State: Yiddish and Italian Anarchism in America is a book by historian Kenyon Zimmer that covers the anarchist ideology practiced by Italian immigrants and Eastern European Jewish immigrants in New York City, San Francisco, and Paterson, New Jersey, at the turn of the 20th century. The book was published by University of Illinois Press in 2015.

References

Further reading 

 
 
 
 
 
 
 
 
 
 
 https://www.lwbooks.co.uk/anarchist-studies/24-2

External links 
 

2015 non-fiction books
Ashkenazi Jewish culture in New York City
Ashkenazi Jewish culture in New Jersey
Ashkenazi Jewish culture in California
Books about anarchism
Books about immigration to the United States
Italian-American culture in New Jersey
Italian-American culture in New York City
Italian-American culture in San Francisco
University of Illinois Press books
Jewish-American history
Jews and Judaism in New York City
Jews and Judaism in San Francisco
Italian-American history
English-language books
Paterson, New Jersey